This is a list of notable Brazilian visual artists.

 Abigail de Andrade
 Abraham Palatnik
 Adriana Bertini
 Aleijadinho
 Alexandre Orion
 Anita Malfatti
 Artur Barrio
 Augusto de Campos
 Bel Borba
 Beto Shwafaty
 Brígida Baltar
 Carlos Latuff
 Carybé
 Celeida Tostes 
 Cildo Meireles
 Cybèle Varela
 Denis Mandarino
 Edgard Cognat
 Eduardo Kac
 Eduardo Munniz
 Eduardo Recife
 Everaldo Coelho
 Francisco Brennand
 Giselda Leirner
 Gustavo Chams
 Guy Veloso
 Hélio Oiticica
 Hércules Florence
 Iberê Camargo
 Iran do Espirito Santo
 José Pancetti
 The Kid
 Letícia Parente
 Lucia Nogueira
 Lygia Clark
 Lygia Pape
 Marcello Dantas
 Marina Amaral
 Miguel Torres de Andrade
 Moysés Baumstein
 Nair de Tefé
 Naza
 Niobe Xandó
 Os Gêmeos
 Rachel Rosalen
 Rodrigo Franzão
 Romero Britto
 Katie van Scherpenberg
 Sergio de Camargo
 Sergio Rossetti Morosini
 Silvia Poloto
 Sonia Gomes
 Tiago Carneiro da Cunha
 Tarsila do Amaral
 Vik Muniz
 Wanda Pimentel 
 Zero
 Alexandre da Cunha

See also

 Brazilian art
 List of Brazilian women artists

 
Brazilian
Artists